Besmir Kullolli (born 4 May 1994, in Kavajë) is an Albanian footballer who plays as a defender for Besa Kavajë in the Albanian First Division.

References

1994 births
Living people
Footballers from Kavajë
Albanian footballers
Association football defenders
Besa Kavajë players
KS Sopoti Librazhd players
FK Tomori Berat players
Kategoria Superiore players
Kategoria e Parë players